The Kootenay Ranges, also known as the Western Ranges, are one of the three main subdivisions of the Continental Ranges which comprise the southern half of the Canadian Rockies, the other two subdivisions being the Front Ranges and the Park Ranges (which is the largest of the groupings).  The Kootenay Ranges lie between the Bull River (E) and the town of Golden, British Columbia (W) and south of Kicking Horse Pass, and are the location of the headwaters of the Kootenay River

Subranges
Beaverfoot Range
Hughes Range
Stanford Range
Vermilion Range

References

Landforms of British Columbia, S. Holland, publ. BC Govt, 1976

Mountain ranges of British Columbia
Ranges of the Canadian Rockies
East Kootenay
Columbia Valley